Pleograph was an early type of movie camera constructed in 1894, before those made by the Lumière brothers, by Polish inventor Kazimierz Prószyński. 

Similarly to the Lumière brothers cinematograph, Prószyński's pleograph has also been used as a projector. The apparatus used a rectangle of celluloid with perforation between several parallel rows of images. Using improved pleograph Prószyński shot first short films showing scenes from the life of Warsaw like people skating on in the park ("Ślizgawka w Ogrodzie Saskim" (Rink in Saxon Garden) - 1902).

Prószyński later constructed the first hand held camera called an Aeroscope, the first compressed air camera.

Studio named after it
The first Polish film studio established in Warsaw in 1901 was named after this camera in its Polish spelling.

Bibliography

 Alfred Liebfeld "Polacy na szlakach techniki" WKŁ, Warszawa 1966

References

History of film
Polish inventions
Science and technology in Poland